Harbold is a surname. Notable people with the surname include:

Alexandra Harbold (born 1965), American sprint canoeist
Michael Harbold (born 1968), American sprint canoeist

See also
Harold (surname)
Haubold